So Much may refer to:

"So Much" (song), a 2010 single by Raghav featuring Kardinal Offishall
"So Much", a song by The Sundays on their album Static & Silence
 "So Much", a 1994 book by British author Trish Cooke
The English translation of the album Tanto by Spanish singer-songwriter Pablo Alborán